Time Bomb is a 1984 made-for-TV movie.

Plot summary
A terrorist named Renee DeSalles and her gang target an armored truck taking weapons-grade plutonium across Texas. It is up to a three-man team of "transport specialists" sent there to stop them.

Cast
 Billy Dee Williams as Wes Tanner
 Joseph Bottoms as Daniel 'Dan' Picard
 Merlin Olsen as Jake Calahan
 Morgan Fairchild as Renee DeSalles
 Anne Kerry as Tracy
 Colin Lane as Sean Marchand
 Tom McFadden as Atherton
 Chad Redding as Laura
 Dianne B. Shaw as Cara
 Sandra Fish as Judy Mallory (as Sandi Fish)

External links

1984 television films
1984 films
NBC network original films
Films directed by Paul Krasny
Films scored by Sylvester Levay